Iftikhar "Shufti" Ahmad Chaudhri (8 January 1920 – 2 June 2015) was an officer of the 16th Punjab Regiment, 4th Indian Infantry Division, who won an immediate Military Cross in Italy in 1944. Later he became a senior officer in the Army of Pakistan.

References 

Punjab Regiment officers
1920 births
2015 deaths
People from Kharian